Herbert Solomon (March 13, 1919 – September 20, 2004) was an American statistician. He was a professor emeritus of statistics at Stanford University and co-founder of the university's statistics department. He earned a bachelor's degree from the City College of New York in 1940 and a master's degree from Columbia University in 1941. His studies were interrupted by World War II, during which he was a member of the Statistical Research Group at Columbia. After the war, he would continue his doctoral studies at Stanford, and earned his doctorate in 1950. After serving in the Office of Naval Research from 1948 to 1952, he returned to Columbia as a professor, and taught there from 1952 to 1959. While on sabbatical, he returned to Stanford, where he would teach for the remainder of his life.

In 1954 he was named a Fellow of the American Statistical Association.

References

External links
 

1919 births
2004 deaths
American statisticians
City College of New York alumni
Columbia University alumni
Stanford University alumni
Stanford University faculty
Columbia University faculty
Fellows of the American Statistical Association